Onitlasi Júnior de Moraes Rodrigues (born 3 October 1997), commonly known as Moraes, is a Brazilian footballer who plays as left back for Atlético Goianiense.

Club career

Early career
Born in Goianira, Goiás, Moraes began his career at Goiás' youth setup in 2009. He moved to Atlético Goianiense in 2014, but was loaned to local side  in 2015.

Known as Juninho at that time, he made his senior debut on 5 September 2015, starting in a 1–1 Campeonato Goiano Terceira Divisão home draw against Aparecida. He scored his first goal on 27 September, netting his team's second in a 3–2 away success over Monte Cristo.

Back at Atlético for the 2016 campaign, Moraes extended his contract until 2020 in February. He made his first team debut for the club on 3 February of that year, coming on as a second-half substitute for Jorginho in a 3–0 away win against Trinadade for the Goiano championship.

Flamengo
In May 2016, Moraes moved to Flamengo and was initially assigned to the under-20 squad. He impressed for the under-20s in the 2017 Copa São Paulo de Futebol Júnior, and trained regularly with the first team during the campaign, but was only an unused substitute for a few matches.

São Bento (loan)
On 5 January 2018, Moraes was loaned to São Bento until the end of the season. He featured rarely for the club, appearing in four matches before suffering a knee injury in May.

Atlético Goianiense
Moraes returned to Atlético Goianiense in August 2018, on loan until the end of the year. He signed a permanent contract with the club ahead of the 2019 campaign, as his contract with Mengão expired.

A regular starter in the 2019 Goiano, Moraes lost his first-choice status to new signing Nicolas Vichiatto in the 2019 Série B and featured in only four matches.

Mirassol (loan)
On 17 July 2020, Moraes was loaned to Série D side Mirassol until June 2021. He immediately became a starter at his new club, helping in their promotion to the Série C as champions.

Santos (loan)
On 27 May 2021, Moraes was loaned to Santos until the following April, with a €1 million buyout clause.

Personal life
Moraes' is named after his grandfather, Isaltino, with Onitlasi being his name backwards.

Career statistics

Honours
Flamengo
 Campeonato Carioca: 2017

Atlético Goianiense
 Campeonato Goiano: 2019

Mirassol
 Campeonato Brasileiro Série D: 2020

References

External links

1997 births
Living people
Sportspeople from Goiás
Brazilian footballers
Association football defenders
Campeonato Brasileiro Série A players
Campeonato Brasileiro Série B players
Campeonato Brasileiro Série D players
Atlético Clube Goianiense players
CR Flamengo footballers
Esporte Clube São Bento players
Mirassol Futebol Clube players
Santos FC players
Esporte Clube Juventude players